Devi Permatasari (born June 11, 1974, in Palembang, Indonesia) is an Indonesian actress, presenter, and model. She has appeared in the soap operas  Anak-Anak Manusia with Teddy Syach, Primus Yustisio, and Jihan Fahira.

Career
She began her career as a model, and has been working as an actress since her first appearance in the soap opera. Mahkota Mayangkara. She became known to the public since her appearance in Tirai Sutra. She has also appeared in Senandung, Cinta Berkalang Noda, Menjemput Impian, Anak-Anakku Sayang, Akhir Sebuah Impian, Benih-Benih Cinta, Singgasana Brahma Kumbara, Dua Dunia, Sebuah Permintaan, Belenggu Kasih and Jacky.  In film, she worked on the movies Saur Sepuh IV, Titisan Darah Biru, Walet Merah and Gairah Malam. She is still active in soap operas, such as the religious soap operas Hidayah, Pintu Hidayah,  and Maha Kasih 2. She has worked as a television presenter on Gebyar BCA. She has a flower arranging business named Cantika in Kebayoran Baru.

Personal life
She married and has one Daughter

Filmography

Film
 Babad Tanah Leluhur II (1991)
 Saur Sepuh IV (1991)
 Tutur Tinular III (1992)
 Tutur Tinular IV (1992)
 Walet Merah (1993)
 Gairah Malam (1993)

Soap operas
 Tirai Sutra
 Mahkota Mayangkara
 Singgasana Brahma Kumbara
 Belenggu Kasih
 Sekelam Dendam Marissa
 Jacky
 Sebuah Permintaan
 Dua Dunia
 Bukan Cinta Sesaat
 Akhir Sebuah Cinta
 Dia Ingin Anaknya Mati
 Sajadah Panjang
 Menjemput Impian
 Senandung
 Cinta Berkalang Noda
 Anak-Anakku Sayang
 Benih-Benih Cinta
 Pintu Hidayah
 Hidayah
 Iman
 Insyaf
 Penjaga Hati
 Mimpi-Mimpi Joice
 Hidayah-Mu
 Kusebut Nama-Mu
 Maha Kasih 2
 Jangan Pisahkan Aku
 Maha Cinta
 Melody
 Aisyah
 Hingga Akhir Waktu
 Melati untuk Marvel
 Dia Jantung Hatiku
 Kesetiaan Cinta
 Putri yang Ditukar
 Binar Bening Berlian
 Anak-Anak Manusia
 Tukang Bubur Naik Haji The Series
 Ganteng-ganteng Serigala Returns
 Anak Jalanan
 Anak Langit
 Tuhan ada dimana-mana
 Topeng Kaca
 Istri Tercinta
 Love Story The Series

Television films
 Pencuri Cinta
 Kembali Padaku
 Cinta Bukan Mainan

TV commercials
 Hufagrip

Television presenter
 Gebyar BCA

External links

References

1974 births
Indonesian actresses
Indonesian female models
Indonesian television presenters
People from Palembang
Living people
Indonesian women television presenters